The South Africa cricket team toured Sri Lanka in September 2021 to play three One Day International (ODI) and three Twenty20 International (T20I) matches. The ODI series formed part of the inaugural 2020–2023 ICC Cricket World Cup Super League.

The tour was originally scheduled for June 2020 but the COVID-19 pandemic put the tour in doubt, with Ashley de Silva, CEO of Sri Lanka Cricket and Graeme Smith, acting director of Cricket South Africa, both stating that the teams would need plenty of time to train. On 20 April 2020, both cricket boards confirmed that the tour had been postponed due to the pandemic. On 1 August 2020, Graeme Smith confirmed that the tour had been postponed indefinitely, due to scheduling clashes with the 2020 Caribbean Premier League and the 2020 Indian Premier League.

On 30 July 2021, Cricket South Africa confirmed the tour, with all the matches taking place at the R. Premadasa Stadium in a bio-secure bubble. Sri Lanka won the first ODI match by 14 runs. South Africa then won the rain-affected second ODI match by 67 runs to level the series. Sri Lanka won the third ODI by 78 runs to win the series 2–1. South Africa won the first two T20I matches to win the series with a match to spare. South Africa won the third and final T20I by ten wickets to win the series 3–0.

Squads

On 22 August 2021, Sri Lanka Cricket named a preliminary 30-man squad for the tour, with Dasun Shanaka retaining his captaincy. Sri Lanka did not name individual squads for the ODI and T20I matches, opting instead to name a combined squad of 22 players for the tour.

Junior Dala was ruled out of South Africa's ODI squad after a positive COVID-19 test with Lutho Sipamla named as his replacement. South Africa's captain Temba Bavuma was ruled out the rest of the series, after suffering a fractured thumb in the first ODI. Keshav Maharaj was named as the captain of South Africa for the second and third ODIs.

ODI series

1st ODI

2nd ODI

3rd ODI

T20I series

1st T20I

2nd T20I

3rd T20I

Statistics

Most runs (ODI)

Most wickets (ODI)

Most runs (T20I)

Most wickets (T20I)

West Indian cricket team in Sri Lanka in 2021–22

Notes

References

External links
 Series home at ESPN Cricinfo

2021 in Sri Lankan cricket
2021 in South African cricket
International cricket competitions in 2021–22
South African cricket tours of Sri Lanka
Cricket events postponed due to the COVID-19 pandemic